Nanorrhinum kuriense is a species of plant in the family Plantaginaceae. It is endemic to Yemen.  Its natural habitat is rocky areas.

References

Endemic flora of Socotra
kuriense
Vulnerable plants
Taxonomy articles created by Polbot